The Volkswagen BUDD-e is an electric concept car made by German car manufacturer Volkswagen. The BUDD-e has been often compared to the Volkswagen Microbus.

The BUDD-e was first shown at the 2016 Consumer Electronics Show; Volkswagen stated that it would be released around 2020, though this appears to have been put back to 2023. The BUDD-e was intended to feature touch, voice, and gesture control, as well as digital displays called E-Mirrors instead of the usual side mirrors.

See also
 Volkswagen I.D. Buzz
 Volkswagen Microbus/Bulli concept vehicles

References

Budd